Force Medical Examiner or Forensic Medical Examiner (FME) is any doctor used by the police in the United Kingdom. There are usually multiple doctors utilized by a police force, and the FME is the one who happens to be on call. Qualified doctors serving as FMEs generally serve as part of a regional pool for the police stations in their area.

Role
The police may call upon the services of an FME for several different reasons, the most common of which include:

 To confirm and certify death at the scene of a sudden death,
 To examine and provide medical care to injured persons in police custody, or police officers injured on duty,
 To examine those who claim police officers used excessive force or similar malpractice, and record their findings accordingly and officially,
 To be present to take blood samples from suspected drink-drivers who are unable or refusing to provide a breath or urine sample,
 To provide official medical opinion where it is needed (e.g. in cases where impairment is a factor), the FME can also be called to court for a medical opinion where a medical factor is disputed.

External links
 Article on the work of an FME in PULSE (General practitioners' online magazine)

Police positions in the United Kingdom